The 2004–05 season was Chamois Niortais' 13th consecutive season in Ligue 2, the second tier of French football. The team finished second-bottom of the division with 38 points from as many matches, and were subsequently relegated to the Championnat National for the 2005–06 campaign.

Appearances and goals

Ligue 2

League table

Matches

Coupe de France

Coupe de la Ligue

References

Chamois Niortais F.C. seasons
French football clubs 2004–05 season